The following is the list of Crush Gear Nitro episodes, where the airdate shown is the date of the episode aired in Japan for the first time.

Crush Gear Nitro